Marama relates to more than one article:

People
 Mārama, Māori woman who signed the Treaty of Waitangi
 Te Mārama, Māori woman who signed the Treaty of Waitangi
 Marama Davidson, New Zealand politician and Member of Parliament
 Marama Leonard-Higgins,  Māori elder in the Ngāi Tahu iwi 
 Marama Martin, Māori television and radio broadcaster
 Marama Vahirua (born 1980), a Tahitian footballer

Other
 Marama, South Australia, a town and a locality
 Marama (mythology) (or 'malama') is a widespread Polynesian word for 'moon' or 'light'. It may also be the name of a Cook Island lunar deity
 Marama bean (Tylosema esculentum) is a plant native to Africa
 Marama tribe (Luhya), an indigenous tribe of Kenya
 SS Marama, the name of two ships 

Language and nationality disambiguation pages
Māori given names